The Boxer is the debut solo album by Kele Okereke, the lead singer of British indie rock band Bloc Party. Okereke released the album under the professional name of Kele on 21 June 2010. As promotion, he uploaded the songs "Rise" and "Walk Tall" to his personal website on 13 May. The first single from The Boxer was "Tenderoni", released on 14 June, and the second, "Everything You Wanted", on 16 August. The album's third single "On the Lam" was released on 25 October.

The album was released by Wichita Recordings worldwide, except for the US and Canada (Glassnote Records), Australia (a co-release with Shock Records and Co-Op) and Japan (a co-release with Hostess Entertainment). Vinyl copies of the album were released by Wichita and Polydor.

The digital and Japanese versions of the album included bonus tracks and remixes in addition to the standard 10 tracks.

Critical reception

The Boxer received generally favourable reviews from critics, currently holding an aggregate score of 70 on Metacritic.

It received very positive reviews from Allmusic (4/5), Clash (8/10), MusicOMH (4.5/5) and The A.V. Club (B+).

Track listing

Personnel 
Credits adapted from Discogs.

 Kele Okereke – lead vocals, songwriting, art direction

Additional musicians 
 Jodie Scantlebury – backing vocals (tracks 2, 4, 6, 8 and 9)
 Bobbie Gordon – backing vocals (tracks 2, 4, 8 and 9)

Production 
 XXXChange – production, audio mixing (tracks 1, 2, 4, 6, 9 and 10), recording 
 Chris Coady – mixing (track 3)
 Phillipe Zdar – mixing (tracks 5, 7 and 8)
 Ben Jackson – recording 
 Scott McCormick – recording 
 Mike Marsh – mastering

Design 

 Sarah Piantadosi – photography
 Richard Robinson – design
 Nova Dando – art direction

Publishing 

 Wichita Recordings – publishing
 Shock Records – publishing 
 Glassnote Records – publishing 
 Hostess Entertainment – publishing 
 Polydor Records – publishing

Release history

Charts

Album

Singles

References

2010 debut albums
Wichita Recordings albums
Shock Records albums
Kele Okereke albums
Albums produced by XXXChange